Hirdamali railway station (station code: HDM) is a railway station in Goregaon, Gondia, in the Indian state of Maharashtra. It is situated on the Gondia–Arjuni-Wadsa-Chanda Fort line.

Zone: SECR/South East Central, Division: Nagpur

Train timing

References 

Nagpur SEC railway division
Railway stations in Gondia district